Svett smil is the fourth studio album by Norwegian rock band deLillos.

Track listing
"Beibi"
"Da tiern var gul"
"Elskling"
"Folk tok helt feil"
"Kongepuddelen Odd"
"Stakkars Oslo"
"Ha det bra"
"Sår"
"40 mil ute"
"Tenk så rart"
"Spøkelser"
"Glem de regnfulle damene"
"Tett til hverandre"
"Ensom tenker"

1990 albums
DeLillos albums
Sonet Records albums